The Saturday Paper is an Australian weekly newspaper, launched on 1 March 2014 in hard copy, as an online newspaper and in mobile news format. The paper is circulated throughout Australian capital cities and major regional centres. Since its launch The Saturday Paper has maintained a focus on long-form journalism and in-depth coverage of current affairs, arts and Australian politics.

Publication
The Saturday Paper is published by Morry Schwartz via Schwartz Media, which also publishes books via Black Inc, the magazine The Monthly and the Quarterly Essay. Upon its launch, Schwartz stated he expected The Saturday Paper to be profitable within several years, and the paper should sell "between 60,000 and 80,000 copies a week". Another early projection put that figure at 80,000 to 100,000 copies a week. Ultimately, circulation would blossom to 900,000 by December 2021.

Editors
Author Erik Jensen was the paper's editor from its founding until June 2018, when Vice Media features editor Maddison Connaughton was appointed to the position. Jensen became the paper's editor-in-chief. He was the paper's representative on the judging panel for the annual Horne Prize since its inception in 2016. Jensen replaced Connaughton as editor in June 2021.

Contributors
Regular contributors include journalists Paul Bongiorno, Karen Middleton, Mike Seccombe, Rick Morton, John Hewson and cartoonist Jon Kudelka.

Other contributors include writers Behrouz Boochani, Fiona McGregor, David Marr, Christos Tsiolkas, Margaret Simons, Maxine Beneba Clarke, Richard Flanagan, Kate Holden, Maddee Clark, Martin McKenzie-Murray, Clem Bastow, Shaad D'Souza, Sarah Krasnostein; economist Richard Denniss; former television presenter Leigh Sales; journalists Nakkiah Lui and Michael West; musician and The Whitlams frontman Tim Freedman; and ex-Federal MPs Tony Windsor, Kevin Rudd, and Rob Oakeshott. In 2020, poet, playwright and novelist Alison Croggon became the paper's arts editor.

References

Further reading

External links
 

2014 establishments in Australia
Publications established in 2014
Weekly newspapers published in Australia
Newspapers published in Melbourne